The Four Seasons (Le Quattro Stagioni it) is a cycle of four frescoes by Francesco Sozzi in the Palazzo Isnello, Palermo, Italy.

Description and history 
The cycle, completed in 1760, was painted on the Four Seasons Hall vault of the Counts of Isnello palazzo's. It is a graceful example of Palermitan Rococo, that is, late-Sicilian Baroque, fresco cycles. The four paintings are framed in butterfly wing shape, decorative solution adopted at Palazzo Isnello. Among the gilded stucco decoration of the vault there is the artist signature, dated 1760 in golden characters.

In the four allegorical paintings each of the seasons is represented by the image of a deity: Venus represents spring, Ceres, summer; Bacchus, autumn; and finally Aeolus represents winter.

Images

References

Bibliography 
Citti Siracusano, La pittura del Settecento in Sicilia. Rome, De Luca, 1986.
Rita Cedrini. Repertorio delle dimore nobili e notabili nella Sicilia del XVIII secolo. Palermo, Regione Siciliana BBCCAA, 2003.
Giulia Sommariva. Palazzi nobiliari a Palermo. Palermo, Flaccovio, 2004. 
Mariny Guttilla. Cantieri decorativi a Palermo dal tardo barocco alle soglie del neoclassicismo, in Il Settecento e il suo doppio. Palermo, Kalós, 2008, p. 177-206.

Notes

External links 

 Frescoes of Palazzo Isnello on Flickr

1760 paintings
Baroque paintings
Fresco paintings in Palermo